Doxa Neo Sidirochori Football Club is a Greek football club, based in Neo Sidirochori, Rhodope, Greece.

Honours
 Thrace FCA Champions:4
 1983–84, 1985–86, 2016–17, 2019-20
 Thrace FCA Cup Winners: 1
 2015–16

References

Football clubs in Eastern Macedonia and Thrace
Rhodope
Association football clubs established in 1958
1958 establishments in Greece
Gamma Ethniki clubs